Allende Municipality may refer to:

 Allende Municipality, Chihuahua, a municipality in Chihuahua, Mexico
 Allende Municipality, Coahuila, a municipality in Coahuila, Mexico
 Allende Municipality, Nuevo León, a municipality in Nuevo León, Mexico

Municipality name disambiguation pages